Oreopola is a monotypic moth genus in the subfamily Arctiinae. Its single species, Oreopola athola, is found in Australian island state ofTasmania. Both the genus and species were first described by Turner in 1940.

References

Lithosiini
Monotypic moth genera
Moths of Australia